Lubuklinggau, is a city in South Sumatra, Indonesia. It has an area of 419.80 km² and had a population of 201,308 at the 2010 Census and 234,166 at the 2020 Census. The city was formerly part of the Musi Rawas Regency from which it was separated in 2001.

Geography
The city borders the Rejang Lebong Regency in Bengkulu to the south and west. It also borders the Musi Rawas Regency to the north and east.

Administrative Districts
The city is divided into eight districts (kecamatan), listed below with their areas and their populations at the 2010 Census and 2020 Census:

Transportation

Lubuklinggau is situated on the highway between Palembang and Bengkulu. There are many forms of public transportation in Lubuklinggau, such as becak and angkot. Lubuklinggau is served by Silampari Airport, which is located around 5 km from the town centre. The airport served several flights to Palembang and Jakarta. Railroad tracks connect Lubuklinggau with Palembang to the east. There are two daily train trips from the Lubuklinggau Station to Kertapati Station in Palembang and vice versa.

References

External links 
  

Populated places in South Sumatra
Cities in Indonesia
Cities in South Sumatra